Arjun Singh Bhadauria/Bhadoria was an Indian freedom fighter, progressive leader and politician. He led an underground resistance movement against British colonialism in central India in the 1940s. Arjun Singh Bhadauria was imprisoned multiple times for his political activism, both, before and after India's independence. He was known popularly by his sobriquet, "Commander Sahab" or "The Honorable Commander", a term of honor accorded to Arjun Singh Bhadauria by his life long comrades, Acharya Narendra Dev, Dr. Ram Manohar Lohia and Jayprakash Narayan, in recognition of his leading role in the freedom struggle. Arjun Singh Bhadauria  advanced farmers' and peasants' rights all through his political career, and had, in fact, merged his historically significant and politically crucial peasants and farmers led anti-imperialist movement in the Chambal region of central India with the emergent "Socialist Party of India", which broke with the Indian National Congress in the late 1940s under the leadership of Lohia, Narayan and Narendra Dev to advance a progressive agenda for India.  He was elected to the Lok Sabha, the lower house of the Indian Parliament from Etawah, Uttar Pradesh where he served three terms. In the mid-1970s, Arjun Singh Bhadauria, along with his wife Sarla Bhadauria, partnered with Jayprakash Narayan and other leaders in the anti-corruption and pro-democracy movement aimed against the then Congress government of Indira Gandhi, for which he spent 19 months in prison during the period of "Emergency" (1975–77). Arjun Singh Bhadauria passed away in 2004.

References

External links
Official biographical sketch in Parliament of India website

Bibliography

1. Neenv Ke Patthar (2 volumes), Samajvadi Prakashan. Author - Arjun Singh Bhadauria

2. Chambal Ke Mahanayak, National Book Trust, India. https://www.amazon.in/CHAMBAL-KE-MAHANAYAK-ARJUN-BHADORIA/dp/9354912621

Lok Sabha members from Uttar Pradesh
India MPs 1957–1962
India MPs 1967–1970
India MPs 1977–1979
Janata Party politicians
1910 births
2004 deaths
Bharatiya Lok Dal politicians
Samyukta Socialist Party politicians
Indian National Congress politicians
Praja Socialist Party politicians